Walter Blount, 1st Baron Mountjoy, KG (1 August 1474) was an English politician.

Early life and family
Walter Blount was born about 1416, the eldest son of Sir Thomas Blount (1378–1456) and Margery Gresley and grandson of Sir Walter Blount.

Career
He was made Steward of the High Peak in Derbyshire and became a bitter rival of the local Vernon and Longford families, replacing the Vernons in parliament as the near-permanent Knight of the Shire (1447, Feb. 1449, 1450–51, 1453–54, 1455–56, 1460–61) for Derbyshire. He succeeded his father, Sir Thomas Blount, as Treasurer of Calais in 1460, becoming governor a year later as a reward for service rendered to King Edward IV at the Battle of Towton. Edward conferred on him in 1467 rich estates in Devon forfeited by the Earl of Devon; and in 1465 Blount was made lord high treasurer and created Baron Mountjoy. This creation is noteworthy as one of the earliest examples of a baronial title not being of a territorial character, nor the title of a dignity already existing. Blount's great-grandfather had married Isolda, daughter and heiress of Sir Thomas de Mountjoy, and the title was probably chosen to commemorate this alliance.

He was made a Knight of the Garter in 1472.

On his death on 1 August 1474 in Greyfriars, London, his grandson Edward Blount, 2nd Baron Mountjoy inherited his title. His eldest son (and Edward's father) Sir William Blount had been killed at the Battle of Barnet in 1471.

Marriages and children

Mountjoy married firstly Helena Byron, the daughter of Sir John Byron of Clayton, Lancashire, by whom he had four sons and two daughters.

William Blount, eldest son and heir, who died in 1471 of wounds received at the Battle of Barnet.
John Blount, 3rd Baron Mountjoy, second son.
James Blount, third son.
Edward Blount.
Anne Blount.
Elizabeth Blount.

By November 1467 Mountjoy married secondly Anne (née Neville), widow of Humphrey Stafford, 1st Duke of Buckingham (d. 1460), and daughter of Ralph Neville, 1st Earl of Westmorland.

Notes

References

Further reading

 

1416 births
1474 deaths
Treasurers of Calais
Knights of the Garter
Members of the Parliament of England for Derbyshire
Lord High Treasurers of England
English MPs 1447
English MPs February 1449
English MPs 1450
English MPs 1453
English MPs 1455
English MPs 1460
Barons Mountjoy (1465)